The  is the 27th edition of the Japan Academy Film Prize, an award presented by the Nippon Academy-Sho Association to award excellence in filmmaking. It awarded the best films of 2003 and it took place on February 20, 2004 at the Grand Prince Hotel New Takanawa in Tokyo, Japan.

Nominees

Awards

References

External links 
  - 
 Complete list of awards and nominations for the 27th Japan Academy Prize - 

Japan Academy Film Prize
2004 in Japanese cinema
Japan Academy Film Prize
February 2004 events in Japan